Sphenorhynchia is an extinct genus of brachiopods belonging to the family Prionorhynchiidae.

These brachiopods are stationary epifaunal suspension feeders. They lived in the Jurassic period, from 183.0 to 164.7 Ma.   Fossils of this genus have been found in the sediments of Afghanistan, Bulgaria, France, Germany, Italy, Saudi Arabia and Slovakia.

Species 
Sphenorhynchia angulata Cooper 1989
Sphenorhynchia bugeysiaca Riche 1893
Sphenorhynchia ferryi Deslongchamps 1859
Sphenorhynchia latereplanata Seifert 1963
Sphenorhynchia plicatella Sowerby 1825
Sphenorhynchia varicostata Cooper 1989

References 

 Yves Almeras - Révision systématique du genre Sphenorhynchia Buckman, 1918 (Brachiopoda, Rhynchonellidae): Implications taxonomiques, évolution, biostratigraphie.

Rhynchonellida

Prehistoric brachiopod genera
Rhynchonellida